Professor David Wayne Johnson   is an Australian nephrologist known for kidney treatments and transplants in Australia. In 2009 he was a Queensland State Finalist for Australian of the Year, for his work in the early recognition and care of people with chronic kidney disease and specifically for his work in detection of chronic kidney disease.

Current roles
Johnson currently holds multiple positions within various medical and academic facilities in South East Queensland and Australia, including:
 Director of the Metro South and Ipswich Nephrology and Transplant Service (MINTS)
 Medical Director of the Queensland Renal Transplant Service at Princess Alexandra Hospital 
 Professor of Medicine and Professor of Population Health at University of Queensland,
 Director of the Centre for Kidney Disease Research, 
 Theme Leader of Diamantina Health Partners Chronic Disease and Ageing, 
 Chair of the CARI Guidelines Working Parties on Peritoneal Dialysis Adequacy, 
 Evaluation of Renal Function and Management of Early CKD, 
 Chair of the Kidney Check Australia Taskforce, 
 Co-chair of the Australasian Creatinine and eGFR Consensus Working Party, 
 Co-chair of the Australasian Proteinuria Consensus Working Party, 
 Founding Member and Deputy Chair of the Australasian Kidney Trials Network, 
 Founding Member of the NHMRC-endorsed Cardiovascular and Renal Centre of Clinical Research Excellence (CCRE), 
 Member of the ANZDATA Registry Peritoneal Dialysis Working Group, 
 International Society of Peritoneal Dialysis Councillor and International Society of Nephrology Councillor.

Awards and recognition 
 2005 – TJ Neale Award by the Australian and New Zealand Society of Nephrology for outstanding contributions to nephrologic science
 2009 – Queensland finalist in the Australian of the Year Awards
 2011 – Public Service Medal by the Governor-General of Australia for outstanding public service, particularly research into the early detection and management of kidney disease
 2014 – International Distinguished Medal by the US National Kidney Foundation
 2019 – Fellow of the Australian Academy of Health and Medical Sciences (FAHMS)

Publications
Johnson's notable contributions to kidney research include:
 Guidelines for the management of absolute cardiovascular disease risk
 Hepatitis C infection in dialysis 
 Chronic kidney disease (CKD) management in general practice
 Translational Research Institute (Australia) (TRI) Awards 2014 Grant
 NRMRC Practitioner Fellowship

References

Living people
1964 births
Fellows of the Royal Australasian College of Physicians
Australian nephrologists
Medical doctors from Brisbane
Medical doctors from Queensland
University of Queensland Mayne Medical School alumni
Academic staff of the University of Queensland
21st-century Australian medical doctors